Mabujah ( also spelled Mabuja, Mabouja, Mabouga, Mabujeh or Al Mab`ujah)  is a village in central Syria located in the Sabburah Subdistrict of the Salamiyah District in Hama Governorate.  According to the Syria Central Bureau of Statistics (CBS), Mabujah had a population of 2,929 in the 2004 census. A majority of the village's inhabitants are Ismaili Muslims, but there are also significant communities of Alawite and Sunni Muslims.

During the ongoing Syrian Civil War, on 31 March 2015, terrorists from ISIL attacked the village and murdered from 37 to 44 of its inhabitants. Those killed came from all of the village's religious sects and included whole families. Syrian Arab Army forces repelled the militants hours later. According to the Syrian military, the attack was part of IS's efforts to advance toward the cities of Hama and Homs via the Syrian Desert.

References 

Populated places in Salamiyah District
Alawite communities in Syria
Ismaili communities in Syria